Dana Energy (Shirkat-e Enurzhi Dana) is a private oil and gas company headquartered in Tehran, Iran. It is an Exploration and Production (E&P) and Oilfield Services company operating in MENA. Dana Energy was formed in 2000, initially as an Oilfield Services company and ventured into field development in 2008. By the addition of petroleum products trading to its portfolio in 2013, Dana Energy has extended into the midstream sector.

History 
Dana Energy was established in 2000 in Tehran, as a privately held company with the main purpose of providing service to upstream oil and gas projects. The company started its first seismic project and service provision for Iran's upstream sector in 2002. In 2003, they embarked on seismic services in Iran's south western oil fields. In 2006, the company got involved in the execution of drilling projects and the provision of rig and drilling services.

Their onshore drilling services and rig lease began in 2007. Dana Energy was awarded drilling contracts in 2008 for 22 wells in Phases 15&16 of South Pars, and in 2011 drilled another 22 wells in phases 17&18. A year later, the first international experience was carried out by fulfilling two seismic projects in Pakistan. In 2013, petroleum products trading commenced and in 2015, the new corporate governance model was launched. In 2016, Dana Energy qualified as an Iranian E&P company.

In 2015, Dana Energy went through a restructuring where the business went from a holding to a corporate structure, unifying all of its divisions and subsidiaries under one brand. The re-branding occurred at the same time to allow the look and feel of the brand to match the new way of the business, which aimed to be more dynamic, streamline and efficient.

Dana Energy was the first privately held business to qualify as an E&P company by NIOC in June 2016.

Operations 
Dana Energy is currently organized into three business segments:

Exploration and production 
A deal was struck on 14 December 2008, for Dana Energy to acquire Petroiran Company under the privatization law, which permitted the government to sell its assets. The purchase, however, wasn't finalized. The acquisition was initially conducted following Dana Energy's strategy in becoming an E&P company.

Since its qualification, Dana Energy has signed several Memorandum of Understandings (MoUs) with international oil companies for development studies on Iranian oilfields. These MoU include: Austria's OMV for Band-e-Karkheh, Norway's DNO for Changuleh Sohrab, West-Paydar and Aban are other oilfields that have been studied by Dana Energy and their partners. Dana Energy signed another MoU with NIOC or the development study of Sepher and Jufeyr oilfields.

Oilfield services 
Dana Energy's OFS segment includes seismic services, data processing and subsurface imaging, drilling operations, rig provision and management, along with a wide range of drilling services such as cementing and acidizing and provision of drill bits and down-hole equipment. Dana Energy has carried out offshore and onshore projects mostly in southern and western parts of Iran and conducting offshore drilling activities of South Pars gas field located in the Persian Gulf.

Dana Energy drilled 44 wells in total in Phases 15, 16, 17, and 18 with contracts exceeding US$1.7 billion. The company has a record of drilling 497 meters a day in well SPD16-06. More than 6,000 meters were perforated in less than two months with minimum nonproductive time. Dana Energy has also carried out simultaneous operations (SIMOPS) which included, drilling new wells, acidizing and clean-up of finished wells whilst producing gas in phase 15. This job was one of a kind in the region and was successfully managed with high safety standards. Dana Energy provided cementing and stimulating services in Phases 9, 10, 14, 15, 16, 17, 18, 20, and 21 of the South Pars.

Geophysical services 
The company is equipped with a data processing center. In 2012, this department was awarded the contract for Bibihakimeh project, which was the largest mountainous 3D seismic assignment in Iran. This project was located in south west of Iran, covering 1627 km2 and 106,222 shot points were recorded in this project.

In 2016, this division signed an agreement with France's CGG Services SA to cooperate in defining, execution and implementation of onshore seismic data acquisition and processing projects in Iran.

Dana Energy's Geophysical Services international activities started in Pakistan where two 3D seismic data acquisitions in Ratana and Sadiqabad and a 2D seismic data acquisition in Hisal were carried out.

Well stimulation vessel  

Dana Energy owns a stimulation vessel that is able to apply the three commonly used well stimulation techniques. The techniques includes acid injection, solvents solution, nitrogen lifting and hydraulic fracturing. The ship has storage capacity for 90,000 gallons of acid and 18,500 gallons of chemical additives; and a water maker with a capacity of 25 metric tons.

Energy trading 
Since 2013, Dana Energy started trading petroleum products in the region, i.e. MENA, East Africa and South Eat Asia. Products include: Fuel Oil, Gasoil, Gasoline, Naphtha, and LPG. This segment has started the initial developments in renewable energy projects.

References

Oil and gas companies of Iran
Oilfield services companies
Companies based in Tehran
Iranian entities subject to the U.S. Department of the Treasury sanctions